Turning Point Action (TPA) is a 501(c)(4) organization founded by Turning Point USA founder Charlie Kirk. In July 2019, TPA purchased Students for Trump, a youth group founded in 2015 at Campbell University in Buies Creek, North Carolina by John Lambert and Ryan Fournier.

History

In May 2019, it was reported that Kirk was "preparing to unveil" Turning Point Action, a 501(c)(4) entity allowed to target Democrats. While the group claims to be a "completely separate organization" from Turning Point USA, Forbes noted that both were founded by Kirk and use common marketing and branding styles.

In July 2019, TPA purchased the assets of Students for Trump, a youth group founded in 2015 at Campbell University in Buies Creek, North Carolina by John Lambert and Ryan Fournier.

2020 presidential elections
In September 2020, The Washington Post reported Turning Point Action had paid young people in Arizona, some of them minors, to post Turning Point content on their social media accounts without disclosing their affiliation with Turning Point, and that Turning Point had given them specific instructions how to make minor alterations to the content to prevent detection that it came from the same source. The posts cast doubt on the integrity of the electoral process, and downplayed the threat from COVID-19.

The campaign has been likened to a "troll farm", avoiding the content moderation processes of social media platforms.  According to an examination by the newspaper and an independent data science specialist, the campaign was highly coordinated and included similar messaging under the instruction of Turning Point to prevent detection. Some of the messages were false and some were partisan. One message posted on Twitter "claimed coronavirus numbers were intentionally inflated" and that "it’s hard to know what to believe." Another tweet warned to not trust Anthony Fauci. The Washington Post reported that Twitter responded to their questions by suspending at least 20 accounts for their involvement in "platform manipulation and spam."

On Facebook, a comment cast doubts on mail-in ballots because of the potential of mail fraud. An Instagram comment claimed that 28 million ballots went missing in the past four elections, implying voter fraud. In actuality, the missing ballots were neither returned as undeliverable nor returned by voters. Also targeted in the messaging was Joe Biden, 2020 Democratic presidential candidate at the time, along with other Democratic politicians, and news organizations on social media. One message claimed that Biden "is being controlled by behind the scenes individuals who want to take America down the dangerous path towards socialism." Facebook removed a number of accounts during their ongoing investigation. Austin Smith, a field director for Turning Point told The Washington Post: "This is sincere political activism conducted by real people who passionately hold the beliefs they describe online, not an anonymous troll farm in Russia." Jake Hoffman, CEO of a Phoenix-based digital marketing firm that joined Turning Point for this project explained that "dozens of young people have been excited to share their beliefs on social media." He also added that participants are "using their own personal profiles and sharing their content that reflects their values and beliefs."

After The Washington Post reported the campaign, the accounts associated with the campaign were shut down by Twitter and Facebook.

In July 2021, Turning Point Action hosted a "Rally to Save our Elections". One of the speakers was Trump who spoke for almost two hours, on the topic of voter fraud.

False claims about COVID-19 vaccines 
	
In 2021, Turning Point Action questioned the safety and efficacy of COVID-19 vaccines and started a campaign against college campus' requirements for student vaccinations.

References 

Donald Trump 2020 presidential campaign
2019 establishments
Conservative organizations in the United States